Libby Hill may refer to:

 Libby Hill, Maine, a small town in Maine, U.S.A.
 Libby Hill, Richmond, a neighborhood in Richmond, Virginia, U.S.A.
 The Libby-Hill Block a building in Augusta, Maine
 Miss Earth USA 2019, Libby Hill